Imboden Methodist Episcopal Church, South, now the Imboden United Methodist Church, is a historic church at 113 Main Street in Imboden, Arkansas.  It is a two-story brick building with Classical Revival styling.  Designed by the Reverend James Glover, a former building contractor, it was built in 1922 for a congregation established in 1884, and is the city's finest example of Classical Revival architecture.  It has a roughly cruciform plan, with a front porch supported by square posts, and topped by a parapet similar to that ringing the main roof.

The church was listed on the National Register of Historic Places in 2004.

See also
National Register of Historic Places listings in Lawrence County, Arkansas

References

Methodist churches in Arkansas
Churches on the National Register of Historic Places in Arkansas
Neoclassical architecture in Arkansas
Churches completed in 1922
Buildings and structures in Lawrence County, Arkansas
National Register of Historic Places in Lawrence County, Arkansas
Neoclassical church buildings in the United States